Saint-Médard is a village of Wallonia and a district of the municipality of Herbeumont, located in the province of Luxembourg, Belgium.

Saint-Médard has a history that goes back to 941. During the Middle Ages, it was subjected to the Counts of Chiny. The village church was built in 1857 and renovated in 1985.

References

External links

Former municipalities of Luxembourg (Belgium)